Luis Crescencio Sandoval González (born 7 February 1960) is the current Mexican Secretary of Defense.

Biography
Sandoval González was born on 7 February 1960 in Ensenada, Baja California. In the Heroic Military Academy he attended high school and studies of formation of army officers. He also graduated in administration military school Superior of war.

He holds a bachelor's degree in military administration from the National Superior School of War, and a master's degree in military administration for national defense and security.

Sandoval has served as a section Commander in the Third Battalion of Military Police in the City of Mexico; he was also Head of the Technical Section and Private Secretary of the Senior Officer of the SEDENA. He was Deputy Chief of Staff of the General Headquarters of the Military Zone of Colima 20, as well as Deputy Chief of Section Five and Six of the Presidential Staff, as well as Commander of the Fourth Military Region.

In a field of foreign policy, he was appointed as Added Military Assistant at the Mexican Embassy in the District of Columbia (United States).

Sandoval was awarded the Legion of Honour, given by the French Government.

References 

1960 births
Living people
Mexican Secretaries of Defense
Mexican generals
21st-century Mexican politicians
Cabinet of Andrés Manuel López Obrador
Military personnel from Baja California
Politicians from Baja California
People from Ensenada, Baja California